Skogmo Chapel is a chapel of the Church of Norway in Brønnøy Municipality in Nordland county, Norway. It is located in the village of Indreskomo. It is an annex chapel in the Brønnøy parish which is part of the Sør-Helgeland prosti (deanery) in the Diocese of Sør-Hålogaland. The white, wooden chapel was built in a long church style in 1979.

See also
List of churches in Sør-Hålogaland

References

Brønnøy
Churches in Nordland
Wooden churches in Norway
20th-century Church of Norway church buildings
Churches completed in 1979
1979 establishments in Norway
Long churches in Norway